The West Pole is the ninth studio album by the Dutch rock band The Gathering. It is the first album to feature the new vocalist Silje Wergeland, previous frontwoman of Octavia Sperati. This album also includes two guest singers, Dutch Anne van den Hoogen and Mexican Marcela Bovio (Stream of Passion), as well as other guest musicians. Music videos were made of the songs "All You Are" and "No Bird Call".

Track listing

Charts

Personnel 
Band members
 Silje Wergeland – vocals and grand piano
 René Rutten – electric and acoustic guitars, stylophone
 Frank Boeijen – keyboards, piano, harmonium and vibraphone
 Marjolein Kooijman – bass guitar
 Hans Rutten – drums and percussions

Additional musicians
 Marcela Bovio – vocals on track 8
 Anne van den Hoogen – vocals on track 6, megaphone nonsense on track 1 and megaphone backing vocals on track 2
 Jos van den Dungen – violin and viola on tracks 2, 3, 4, 5 and 8
 John Mitchell – cello on tracks 3, 4, 5 and 8
 Marije de Jong and Jonas Pap – narrative on track 4

References 

The Gathering (band) albums
2009 albums